Sarana may refer to:

People 
 Alexey Sarana (born 2000), Russian chess grandmaster

Places 
 Sarana, Bazèga, Burkina Faso
 Sarana Bay, Attu Island, Aleutian Islands, Alaska
 Sarana Pass, Attu Island, Aleutian Islands, Alaska
 Sarana, Pella, Burkina Faso
 Sarana, Sabou, Burkina Faso
 Sarana Valley, Attu Island, Aleutian Islands, Alaska

Other
 Saraṇa, the Pali term for Refuge in Buddhism
 Śaraṇa, the Sanskrit term for Refuge in Buddhism